Lee Jung-ok (born ) was a South Korean female volleyball player. She was part of the South Korea women's national volleyball team.

She competed with the national team at the 2004 Summer Olympics in Athens, Greece. 
She played with LG Caltex Oil in 2004.

Clubs
  LG Caltex Oil (2004)

See also
 South Korea at the 2004 Summer Olympics

References

External links
http://www.fivb.org/EN/volleyball/competitions/WorldGrandPrix/2006/Teams/Team_Roster.asp?TEAM=KOR&TRN=WGP2006&sm=60

1983 births
Living people
South Korean women's volleyball players
Place of birth missing (living people)
Volleyball players at the 2004 Summer Olympics
Olympic volleyball players of South Korea